Bjerkreim is a village in Bjerkreim municipality in Rogaland county, Norway. The river Bjerkreimselva runs through the village, right past Bjerkreim Church, the main church for the municipality.

References

Villages in Rogaland
Bjerkreim